This is a list of episodes for the thirteenth season (1962–63) of the television version of The Jack Benny Program.

Episodes

References
 
 

1962 American television seasons
1963 American television seasons
Jack 13